is the Chairman of the National Public Safety Commission, the Minister of State for Disaster Management and the Minister of State for National Emergency Legislation in Japanese Prime Minister Junichiro Koizumi's Cabinet.

Born in the city of Shizuoka, Murata graduated from Faculty of Law, Kyoto University and joined the Ministry of Finance in 1968. In 1990, he was elected to the House of Representatives for the first time and, since September 2004 he has been on the present posts.

External links
 http://www.unisdr.org/wcdr/biography.htm

1944 births
Living people
People from Shizuoka (city)
Kyoto University alumni
École nationale d'administration alumni
Members of the House of Representatives (Japan)
Government ministers of Japan
21st-century Japanese politicians